Plusiopalpa is a genus of moths of the family Noctuidae.

Species
 Plusiopalpa adrasta Felder, 1874
 Plusiopalpa dichora Holland, 1894
 Plusiopalpa hildebrandti Saalmüller, 1891
 Plusiopalpa thaumasia Dufay, 1968

References
 Natural History Museum Lepidoptera genus database
 Plusiopalpa at funet.fi

Plusiinae